Crosbie Baulch (born 3 July 1959) is an Australian sprint canoeist who competed in the early 1980s. At the 1980 Summer Olympics in Moscow, he finished eighth in the K-4 1000 m event.

References
Sports-Reference.com profile

1959 births
Australian male canoeists
Canoeists at the 1980 Summer Olympics
Living people
Olympic canoeists of Australia
20th-century Australian people